L3Harris Wescam, stylized as L3Harris WESCAM, is a Canadian company specializing in the production of gyro-stabilized, EO-IR imaging systems. Wescam Inc. is a subsidiary of L3Harris Technologies. The name has become synonymous with cameras of the type although several organizations around the world manufacture similar systems. Wescam is based in Hamilton, Ontario, Canada.

History

In 1959, the military division of Westinghouse Canada developed a stabilized camera mount for the Canadian Defense Research Establishment. The product was named WESSCAM - Westinghouse Steered Stabilized Camera Mount.

In 1974, WESSCAM inventor Nox Leavitt purchased the lab equipment and patents from Westinghouse and founded Istec Limited, Isolation Stabilization Technologies. The company had 17 employees and generated approximately $1 million in revenue. It experienced substantial expansion through internal growth and strategic acquisitions. This brought complementary technologies into the company and broadened its intellectual capability and market share.

In 1994, Istec changed its name to Wescam and in 1995 Wescam went public on the Toronto Stock Exchange.

In 2002, L3 Technologies acquired Wescam. As part of L3 Technologies, Wescam has expanded its presence in the U.S., and increased its base of products and service offerings to customers.

In June 2019, L3 Wescam became L3Harris Wescam when their parent company – L3 Technologies – had a "merger of equals" with Harris Corporation.

In November 2021, Wescam moved its headquarters to a new production facility in Hamilton, Ontario.

Products
Wescam's primary product line is the MX-Series, which consists of MX-series turret families—the MX-8, MX-10, MX-15, MX-20 and MX-25. These are all controlled by the US ITAR  They are currently used by defence, homeland security, and law enforcement agencies as well as in televised sporting events, such as NASCAR. These products are typically mounted on fixed-wing, rotor-wing, UAV and Aerostat airborne platforms and also on numerous armoured vehicles, and marine-based platforms.

MX-10

Introduced in 2009, the MX-10 is Wescam's newest imaging system. This small size and low weight reduce the weight and clearance requirements for installation on manned and unmanned airborne platforms. The MX-10 can incorporate several different types of sensors (up to six), including high-definition daylight and infrared sensors.

Wescam has been in the process of creating variations of the MX-10 for use in a wider range of applications. The MX-10GS (GS: Ground System) has been adapted for mounting on a ground vehicle where it can sit atop a mast or tower for a higher point of view, whether the vehicle is moving or stationary.  The MX-10MS (MS:Marinized System) has also been created, and Zyvex Technologies has operated it on the Piranha Unmanned Surface Vessel (USV).

WESCAM's MX 10 is a compact Multi-Sensor, Multi-Spectral imaging system for surveillance missions from light aircraft.

The Wescam MX-10 thermal imaging system houses two cameras. A color camera used primarily during the day can read an object the size of a license plate from more than 750 feet away. The second camera, an infrared thermal imager, can be used during the day and at night. Infrared technology permits the flight crew to see objects that may otherwise go undetected at night.
The MX-10 system costs more than 400.000 US Dollars.

MX-15

The MX-15 is Wescam's most popular family of imaging systems. The MX-15 Family includes the MX-15, the MX-15HDi (High-Definition variant), the MX-15D (Designator variant) and the MX-15GS (Ground System variant). These imaging systems are usually installed on manned fixed- and rotary-wing aircraft. Price for 1 set above $1 million.

MX-20

This larger system is typically installed on large, fixed-wing aircraft, such as the P-3 Orion, Bayraktar Akıncı and Aerostats. This turret is used for long-range surveillance, as it can identify and engage subjects from over 20 km away.

MX-Series key attributes

 Simplified Installation/Integration: These products do not require external or support electronics, thus simplifying installation and reducing weight and space requirements. Wescam has also implemented common operator interfaces and Line Replaceable Units (LRUs) to maintain interchangeability between turret models and platforms within a fleet.
 Long-Range Optimization: MX-Series imaging systems use custom-designed, large-aperture lenses to for high magnification, state-of-the-art sensors for high resolution, and a missile-grade, solid-state Inertial Measurement Unit for "rock-solid" stabilization.
 On-Board Inertial Measurement Unit (IMU): While similar products often require a mounting intercase for the IMU to stabilize the camera, the MX-Series has an integrated IMU, which in turn reduces payload requirements. The IMU allows the system to have a precise, jitter-free lock on any geographic position and a very high target location accuracy, despite aircraft manoeuvres and noise in the aircraft's GPS/INS system. When connected to a GPS antenna, the onboard IMU enables the turret to point to any geographic location supplied by a third party moving map system.
 Compatibility with third-party systems: The MX-Series turrets are able to downlink to third-party communications systems in order to provide a clear visual of the situation in real time. This compatibility allows a wide range of installations, spanning even complex, multi-operational systems.
 Continuous improvement: Wescam invests heavily in research and development in order to incorporate ultramodern technology into the MX-Series. Some contracts also involve a spiral growth path, allowing Wescam to modify the turret over time in order to fit to customers' evolving requirements.

Customers

Wescam serves militaries and agencies around the world. Below is a short list of some of its customers.

 Air Attack, France
 Australian Federal Police
Turkey
 Canadian Department of National Defence
 Catalunya Police
 Chilean Navy
 French Gendarmerie
 Icelandic Coast Guard
 Italian Air Force
 Italian Army
 Italian Carabinieri
 Italian Coast Guard
 Italian Finance Guard
 Italian Navy
 Italian State Police
 Lithuanian Air Force
 Luxembourg Police
 OHB-System, Germany
 Portuguese Air Force
 Royal Netherlands Air Force
 Royal Norwegian Air Force
 Spanish Fisheries
 Spanish UME
 National Police Air Service (NPAS) 
 Swedish Coast Guard
 Trafico Spain
 UK Maritime & Coast Guard
 UK Ministry of Defence
 US Air Force
 US Army
 US Customs & Border Patrol
 US Federal Bureau of Investigation (FBI)
 US Navy

References

External links
Official website

Defence companies of Canada
Infrared imaging